Yenicə may refer to:
Yenicə, Agdash, Azerbaijan
Yenicə, Yevlakh, Azerbaijan